Didier Dubois (born 1952) is a French mathematician.
Since 1999, he is a co-editor-in-chief of the journal Fuzzy Sets and Systems.
In 1993–1997 he was vice-president and president of the International Fuzzy Systems Association.
His research interests include fuzzy set theory, possibility theory, and knowledge representation. Most of his works are co-authored by Henri Prade.

Selected bibliography 

 Dubois, Didier and Prade, Henri (1980). Fuzzy Sets & Systems: Theory and Applications. Academic Press (APNet). 
 Dubois, Didier and Prade, Henri (1988). Possibility Theory: An Approach to Computerized Processing of Uncertainty. New York: Plenum Press.

See also 

 Construction of t-norms for Dubois–Prade t-norms

External links
 Didier Dubois' home page at IRIT
 "On the use of aggregation operations in information fusion process" Didier Dubois, Henri Prade (2004)
 "Interval-valued Fuzzy Sets, Possibility Theory and Imprecise Probability" Didier Dubois, Henri Prade

1952 births
Living people
French mathematicians